"The Continental" is a dance to a song written by Con Conrad with lyrics by Herb Magidson, and was introduced by Ginger Rogers and Fred Astaire in the 1934 film The Gay Divorcee. "The Continental" was the first song to win the  Academy Award for Best Original Song. It was performed by Lillian Miles.

Other recordings
Major record hits at the time of introduction included Lud Gluskin, Jolly Coburn, and Leo Reisman. 
In 1952 Harry James released a recording on the album Hollywood's Best (Columbia B-319 and CL-6224) with Rosemary Clooney on vocals.
A later version by Maureen McGovern reached number 16 on the UK Singles Chart in 1976.

References

Best Original Song Academy Award-winning songs
Fred Astaire songs
Songs with lyrics by Herb Magidson
Songs with music by Con Conrad
1934 songs
Maureen McGovern songs